Fatih Yiğen (born 1 June 1983) is a Turkish football defender who plays for Denizli Belediyespor.

References

External links
 Guardian Stats Centre

1983 births
Living people
Turkish footballers
Denizlispor footballers
Göztepe S.K. footballers
Süper Lig players

Association football defenders